Barcience is a municipality located in the province of Toledo, Castile-La Mancha, Spain.

History
The village was ceded to the House of Silva by Henry IV.

References

Municipalities in the Province of Toledo